Bristle sensilla (sometimes also called tactile hairs) are a class of mechanoreceptors found in insects and other arthropods that respond to mechanical stimuli generated by the external world. As a result, they are considered exteroceptors. Bristle sensilla can be divided into two main types, macrochaete and microchaete, based on their size and physiology. The larger macrochaete are thicker and stouter than the smaller microchaete. Macrochaete are also more consistent in their number and distribution across individuals of the same species. Between species, the organization of macrochaete is more conserved among closely related species, whereas the organization of microchaete is more variable and less correlated with phylogenetic relatedness.

Each bristle sensillum is composed of a hollow hair with its base fixed to the dendrite of a sensory neuron. The hair acts as a lever. When the hair is deflected, for example by dirt or parasites, force is exerted on the dendrite. This induces mechanotransduction channels to open, producing an electrical signal that is carried along an axon to the central nervous system.

Bristles are directionally selective to mechanical deflection. Fly bristles are typically angled 45° relative to the cuticle, and most bristle neurons are most sensitive to forces that push the bristle toward the cuticle. Movement of even a single bristle is sufficient to trigger an insect to groom.

References 

Sensory receptors
Insect anatomy